Josué Homawoo (born 12 November 1997) is a Togolese professional footballer who plays as a defender for  club Red Star.

Career
Born in Togo, Homawoo moved to France at the age of five and a half and began playing football there. A youth product of Elan Sportif Lyon, Lyon, Saint-Priest, he joined the reserves of FC Nantes in 2015. On 6 June 2017, Homawoo signed his first professional contract with Nantes. He made his professional debut with FC Nantes in a 3–3 Ligue 1 tie with Dijon FCO on 8 February 2020.

He moved to Lorient reserves on 2 October 2020. He then transferred Championnat National club Red Star in June 2021.

References

External links
 
 FC Nantes Profile

1997 births
Living people
Sportspeople from Lomé
Togolese footballers
Association football midfielders
FC Nantes players
Red Star F.C. players
Ligue 1 players
Championnat National 2 players
Championnat National 3 players
Togolese expatriate footballers
Togolese expatriate sportspeople in France
Expatriate footballers in France
21st-century Togolese people